The following is a timeline of the history of the city of Ouagadougou, Burkina Faso.

Prior to 20th century
 1896 - 5 September: Ouagadougou taken by French forces; city burned.

20th century

 1904 - Population: 4,000 (estimate).
 1919 - Ouagadougou designated capital of French colonial Upper Volta.
 1920 - Population: 19,332.
 1921 - Catholic Apostolic Vicariate of Ouagadougou established.
 1932 - Upper Volta becomes part of Côte d'Ivoire; capital moves from Ouagadougou.
 1936 - Ouagadougou Cathedral built.
 1955
 Abidjan-Ouagadougou railway begins operating.
 Étoile Filante de Ouagadougou (football club) formed.
 1956 - Joseph Ouédraogo becomes mayor.
 1960 - City becomes capital of independent Burkina Faso.
 1961
 Population: 59,126.
 Joseph Conombo becomes mayor.
 1966 - Population: 77,500 (estimate).
 1969 - Panafrican Film and Television Festival of Ouagadougou begins.
 1972 - Koupéla-Ouagadougou road built.
 1974 - University of Ouagadougou founded.
 1977 - Santos FC (football club) formed.
 1982 - Boromo-Ouagadougou road built.
 1983 - Population: 307,937 (estimate).
 1984 - Stade du 4 Août (stadium) opens.
 1986 - Bobo-Dioulasso-Ouagadougou road built.
 1990 - AS SONABEL (football club) formed.
 1991
 Le Pays newspaper begins publication.
 Population: 634,479 (estimate).
 1995 - Simon Compaoré becomes mayor.
 1996
 Radio Salankoloto begins broadcasting.
 Population: 709,736.
 1998 - 28 February: 1998 African Cup of Nations Final football contest played in Ouagadougou.

21st century

 2004
 November: Meeting of the Organisation internationale de la Francophonie held in city.
 Meeting of the Association Internationale des Maires Francophones held in city.
 2006 - Population: 1,475,223.
 2007
 August: 2007 African Junior Athletics Championships held in city.
 United States military drone base established at airport.
 2014 - October–November: 2014 Burkinabé uprising.
 2016
 15 January: 2016 Ouagadougou attacks by militant Islamists occur.
 Armand Béouindé becomes mayor.
 2017 - 13 August: 2017 Ouagadougou attack.

See also
 Ouagadougou history (de, fr)

References

This article incorporates information from the French Wikipedia.

Bibliography

in English
 
 
 
 
 
   (Includes articles about Ouagadougou)

in French

External links

  (Bibliography of open access  articles)
  (Images, etc.)
  (Images, etc.)
  (Bibliography)
  (Bibliography)
  (Bibliography)
  (Bibliography)
 
 

Timelines of cities in Africa
Years in Burkina Faso
Burkina Faso-related lists
Timelines of capitals